The 1993 Cupa României Final was the 55th final of Romania's most prestigious cup competition. The final was played at the Stadionul Naţional in Bucharest on 26 June 1993 and was contested between Divizia A sides FC U Craiova and Dacia Unirea Brăila. The cup was won by FC U Craiova.

Route to the final

Match details

References

External links
 Official site 

Cupa Romaniei Final, 1993
Cupa României Finals
CS Universitatea Craiova matches